St Germain's Church, Edgbaston is a Grade II listed  Church of England parish church in Birmingham.

History

The land was donated by the Gillott Trustees and the building was started when the foundation stone was laid on 3 July 1915 by George Beech  and erected to designs by the architect Edwin Francis Reynolds and was completed in 1917.

The vicarage by Reynolds was completed in 1924.

Organ

The church has a pipe organ by Rushworth and Dreaper dating from 1922. A specification of the organ can be found on the National Pipe Organ Register.

References

Church of England church buildings in Birmingham, West Midlands
Churches completed in 1917
20th-century Church of England church buildings